Pinch is a Canadian animated short film, directed by Diego Maclean and released in 2019. The film depicts a man who discovers a superpower that challenges his morality.

The film received a Canadian Screen Award nomination for Best Animated Short at the 8th Canadian Screen Awards in 2020.

References

External links
 

2019 films
2010s animated short films
Canadian animated short films
2010s Canadian films